Reggie Sahali-Generale is a Filipino politician and former vice governor of the Autonomous Region in Muslim Mindanao (ARMM). She was the first woman to serve in this position.

Family
Her father, Sadikul A. Sahali, was a two-term Governor of Tawi-Tawi. Her mother, Juana Maquiso Sahali, was a principal of Batu-Batu National High School in Panglima Sugala, Tawi-Tawi. Her three surviving siblings all have positions in government:  Hadja Ruby Sahali-Tan served as the regional secretary of the Department of Social Welfare and Development (DSWD)-ARMM; Nurbert Sahali is mayor of Panglima Sugala, Tawi-Tawi; and Nurjay M. Sahali was secretary to the Governor.

References

Liberal Party (Philippines) politicians
Living people
People from Tawi-Tawi
Filipino Muslims
Year of birth missing (living people)